The Lithuanian A Lyga 1994–95 was the fifth season of top-tier football in Lithuania. The season started on 23 July 1994 and ended on 19 June 1995 with a championship playoff match. It was contested by 12 teams, and Inkaras-Grifas Kaunas won the championship.

Final table

Results

Championship play-off

References 

LFF Lyga seasons
1995 in Lithuanian football
1994 in Lithuanian football
Lith